Michael Joseph Alexander (born 1941) is a British translator, poet, academic and broadcaster. He held the Berry Chair of English Literature at the University of St Andrews until his retirement in 2003. He is best known for his translations of Beowulf and other Anglo-Saxon poems into modern English verse.

He was educated at Downside School, read English at Oxford University, then spent a year in France and in Italy, attending the  University of Perugia.  He then spent some years working in the publishing industry in London, interrupted by attending Princeton University. Before taking up his post at St. Andrews he was a lecturer at the University of Stirling.

For many years he was a member of the Scottish team in Radio 4's Round Britain quiz show.

Beowulf translation 

Alexander states that his verse translation of Beowulf imitated the form of the original, "stimulated by the example of Ezra Pound's version of [the Old English poem] 'The Seafarer'". The scholar Hugh Magennis calls Alexander's translation "accessible but not reductive", notes that it sold "hundreds of thousands" of copies and that it was liked by both students and teachers, and devotes a whole chapter of his book on translating Beowulf to it.

Works 
Criticism, scholarship, educational

The Poetic Achievement of Ezra Pound (1979)
York Notes on Geoffrey Chaucer's "Prologue to the Canterbury Tales" (1999, with Mary Alexander)
A History Of English Literature (2000, 2007, 2013)
A History of Old English Literature (2002)
Mediaevalism: The Middle Ages in Modern England (2007)
Reading Shakespeare (2013)

Poetry

Twelve Poems (1978)

Editions

Beowulf: A Glossed Text (1995, revised 2000)

Translations

The Earliest English Poems (1966, revised 1977, 1991)
Beowulf: A Verse Translation (1973, revised 2001)
Old English Riddles from the Exeter Book (1980, revised 2007)

References

External links 
 Biography
 University of St Andrews Faculty Page

Academics of the University of St Andrews
Living people
Alumni of the University of Oxford
University of Perugia alumni
Princeton University alumni
People educated at Downside School
Translators from Old English
Academics of the University of Stirling
1941 births
British translators
British radio presenters